Problacmaea sybaritica is a species of sea snail, a true limpet, a marine gastropod mollusk in the family Erginidae, one of the families of true limpets.

Description

Distribution
This marine species occurs in the Bering Sea.

References

 Lindberg D.R. (1988). Recent and fossil species of the genus Erginus from the North Pacific Ocean (Patellogastropoda: Mollusca). PaleoBios. 12(46): 1–7.
 Nakano & Ozawa (2007). Worldwide phylogeography of limpets of the order Patellogastropoda: Molecular, morphological and palaeontological evidence. Journal of Molluscan Studies 73(1) 79–99
 Chernyshev, A.V. (2018). Erginidae fam. nov. (Patellogastropoda) – a new family of limpets. Bulletin of the Russian Far East Malacological Society. 22(1-2): 63-68

External links
 Dall, W. H. (1871). On the limpets; with special reference to the species of the west coast of America, and to a more natural classification of the group. American Journal of Conchology. 6(3): 227-282.

Erginidae
Gastropods described in 1871